The BL 4.7-inch, 45-calibre gun (actually a metric 120 mm gun) was a British medium-velocity naval gun introduced in 1918 for destroyers, intended to counter a new generation of heavily armed destroyers that Germany was believed to be developing.

Description and history 

Mk I, of built-up wire-wound construction with propellant charge in a cloth bag went into service beginning in 1918 on destroyers of the new Admiralty type destroyer leader (Scott class) and Thornycroft type leader (Shakespeare class). Some saw service in World War I, but most entered service after the war ended.

It was also mounted on :
 s as re-gunned in 1918
 Thornycroft and Admiralty Modified W-class destroyers completed 1919–1920
 Prototype destroyers  and  commissioned 1926 & 1927

Mk II was a monobloc-barrel (i.e. single-piece, typical of small-medium World War II guns) gun of similar performance introduced in World War II to replace the worn-out Mk I guns on surviving ships.

These were the only BL-type 4.7-inch guns in British service, all others have been of the QF-type. They were superseded on new destroyers from 1930 by the QF 4.7-inch Mk IX.

Ammunition

See also 
 QF 4.7-inch Mk IX: British QF successor
 List of naval guns

Weapons of comparable role, performance and era 
 Type 3 120 mm 45 caliber naval gun : Japanese equivalent
 5"/51 caliber gun : US Navy equivalent

Notes

References

Bibliography 
 Tony DiGiulian, British 4.7"/45 (12 cm) BL Mark I 4.7"/45 (12 cm) BL Mark II

External links 

 

Naval guns of the United Kingdom
World War I naval weapons of the United Kingdom
World War II naval weapons of the United Kingdom
120 mm artillery